Ağcaqovaq (also, Agdzhakovag and Agdzhakovakh) is a village in the Agdash Rayon of Azerbaijan.  The village forms part of the municipality of Eymur.

References 

Populated places in Agdash District